Thai Poranthachu is a 2000 Indian Tamil-language drama film directed by R. K. Kalaimani. The film stars Prabhu and Kausalya whilst Karthik, Vivek and Ponnambalam play supporting roles. It was remade in Telugu as Choosoddaam Randi and it had performed well commercially in box office.

Cast

Prabhu as Vellaiyangiri
Karthik as Aravind (guest appearance)
Kausalya as Geetha
Vivek as Kutti
Ponnambalam as Dharma
Mayilsamy as 'Netrikkann' Netkundram
Chinni Jayanth as James
Vennira Aadai Moorthy
Madhan Bob
Vaiyapuri
Pandu
Vijay Krishnaraj
Anita
Lavanya
 Sridhar as dancer

Soundtrack 
The film score and the soundtrack were composed by film composer Deva. The soundtrack, released in 2000, features 6 tracks with lyrics written by Gangai Amaran and Kalidasan, Ilaya Kamban, Pa. Vijay

References

2000 films
2000s Tamil-language films
Tamil films remade in other languages
Films scored by Deva (composer)
Films directed by R. K. Kalaimani